Alpine Skiing at the 2011 South Asian Winter Games will be held at Auli, India. The four events will be held between January 14 and 15, 2011.

Men's events

Women's events

References

South Asian Winter Games